Bob Hall (1945 – May 2022) was a British sports journalist notable for presenting television sports reports in the English Midlands, where he had a television career spanning four decades. Hall joined ATV Today in 1981 and went on to work for its successor, Central News, where he appeared regularly as a presenter until the early 2000s. Hall was also a contributor to Sky Sports' Soccer Saturday and Black Country Radio. He also briefly worked for the Express & Star newspaper.

References

External links
 

1945 births
2022 deaths
English reporters and correspondents
English television journalists
ITN newsreaders and journalists
British television newsreaders and news presenters
British radio journalists
English radio personalities
ITV regional newsreaders and journalists
English male journalists